The 1900 USC Methodists football team was an American football team that represented the University of Southern California during the 1900 college football season.  The team competed as an independent without a head coach, compiling a 1–1–1 record.

Schedule

References

USC
USC Trojans football seasons
USC Methodists football
USC Methodists football